Sir Roger Mostyn, 5th Baronet (13 November 1734 – 26 July 1796) was a Welsh landowner and politician who sat in the House of Commons for 38 years from 1758 to 1796.

Early life and inheritance
Mostyn was the son of Sir Thomas Mostyn, 4th Baronet of Mostyn, Flintshire and his wife Sarah Western, daughter and co-heiress of Robert Western of London. He was educated at Westminster School from 1745 to 1751 and matriculated at Christ Church, Oxford in 1751.  On the death of his father on 24 March 1758 he succeeded to the baronetcy. He married Margaret Wynn, daughter of Rev. Hugh Wynn, DD, prebendary of Salisbury on 19 May 1766. She was heiress of her father and two uncles  Robert Wynne and Evan Lloyd Vaughan. He inherited a number of estates, including the seat at Mostyn, in both Wales and Cheshire. and £60,000 from his unmarried uncle, Savage Mostyn.

Political career
Mostyn was returned unopposed as Member of Parliament for Flintshire at a by-election on 26 April 1758 replacing his late father. His family had the dominant electoral interest in Flintshire and he was returned unopposed at general elections in 1761, 1768, 1774, 1780, 1784, 1790 and 1796. Mostyn was a Whig whose voting record became a concern to his constituents, and in 1784 his brother-in-law, Thomas Pennant of Downing, threatened to create an opposition although nothing came of it.    

Mostyn served as Lord Lieutenant of Flintshire from 1761 to his death and Custos Rotulorum of Flintshire from 1772 to his death. He was a Lieutenant-Colonel in the Flintshire Militia.

Later life and legacy
Mostyn died on 26 July 1796, "much regretted and esteemed for his many public and private virtues". He and his wife Margaret had a son Thomas and 6 daughters.  He was succeeded in the baronetcy and Parliamentary seat by Thomas, who died unmarried, causing the baronetcy to become extinct. Of his daughters, Charlotte married Sir Thomas Swymmer Mostyn-Champneys, 2nd Bt, Elizabeth married Sir Edward Pryce Lloyd, 2nd Bt and Anna-Maria married Sir Robert Williames Vaughan, 2nd Bt, while Catherine, Essex and Maria Bridget were unmarried.

References

1734 births
1796 deaths
Alumni of Christ Church, Oxford
Baronets in the Baronetage of England
Members of the Parliament of Great Britain for Welsh constituencies
British MPs 1754–1761
British MPs 1761–1768
British MPs 1768–1774
British MPs 1774–1780
British MPs 1780–1784
British MPs 1784–1790
British MPs 1790–1796
Lord-Lieutenants of Flintshire